Stanley Dermott (born 1945) is a British-American astrophysicist and educator. He has been part of the faculty at the University of Florida since 1989 including holding a research foundation professorship from 1997 to 2000 and serving as chair of the department of astronomy from 1993 to 2009. He is credited with the identification of Dermott's law which is named after him. His vast body of work also includes contributions to the study of planetary origins, zodiacal dust bands, resonance effects of planetary satellites, mechanics of narrow planetary rings, tidal interactions, and the statistics of asteroid rotation rates.

References 

1945 births
20th-century American astronomers
20th-century British astronomers
21st-century American astronomers
21st-century British astronomers
American astrophysicists
British astrophysicists
British expatriate academics in the United States
Living people